Philip Thomas Spruce (16 November 1929 – August 2010) was an English professional footballer who played as a defender. He made appearances in the English Football League with Wrexham, and also played in the Welsh league for Rhyl.

Personal life

Spruce had an older brother George, who also played for Wrexham in the early 50s, and also played in the English Football League for Barnsley and Chester City.

References

1929 births
2010 deaths
English footballers
Association football defenders
Wrexham A.F.C. players
Rhyl F.C. players
Colwyn Bay F.C. players
English Football League players